Løvstakken is one of the Seven Mountains that surround the center of the city of Bergen in Vestland county, Norway. Løvstakken and the forests nearby are popular hiking areas among the locals since it is essentially located in the central area of Norway's second largest city. Gullsteinen, a large hill located south of the summit of Løvstakken, is also part of the mountain massif and borders the protected forest area of Langeskogen.

The neighbourhood of Løvstakksiden in Årstad borough, north of the summit, is named after the mountain. The neighborhood was historically a borough of Bergen, but it has more recently dissolved and its areas were merged with Årstad and Fyllingsdalen boroughs.

See also
List of mountains of Norway

References

Mountains of Bergen